(also written 河本 and 川元) is a Japanese surname. Notable people with the surname include:

 Evelyn Kawamoto (1933–2017), an American swimmer and two-time Olympic medalist
 Genshiro Kawamoto, Japanese billionaire
 Homura Kawamoto, Japanese manga artist
 Kihachirō Kawamoto (1925–2010), Japanese animator
 Kohei Kawamoto (born 1979), Japanese butterfly swimmer
 Kunihiro Kawamoto (born 1975), Japanese voice actor
 Makoto Kawamoto (born 1974), Japanese singer-songwriter
 Nobuhiko Kawamoto (born 1936), former CEO of Honda Motor
, Japanese rower
 Taizo Kawamoto (1914–1985), Japanese football player and manager
, Japanese video game composer
 Toshihiro Kawamoto (born 1963), Japanese animator

See also
 Kawamoto, Saitama, former town located in Saitama, Japan
 Kawamoto, Shimane, town located in Shimane, Japan

Japanese-language surnames